Simpson Performance Products is an American motorsports parts supplier. It supplies gloves, helmets, harness systems, driver's suits, head restraints, shoes, and more to racers at local tracks to international teams. It was started by Bill Simpson as Simpson Drag Chutes.

History
In 1958, the 18-year-old Simpson broke both arms in a drag racing crash. Simpson said later, "Until then, I was like most drivers. The only time I thought about safety was after I'd been hurt. This time, I was hurt bad enough to do a lot of thinking."

Simpson's uncle owned a military surplus store, and suggested that he use a cross-form parachute to slow down the drag car. Simpson rented a sewing machine to create a prototype. Simpson got together with his friend dragster driver Mike Sorokin to test the prototype. They tested it by attaching it to a tow hitch, and dumping it from the back of the Chevy wagon while Sorokin drove down a street at 100 mph. The chute was too big for the car, and the car went airborne and crashed into a tree nursery. Both racers were jailed for the incident, but Simpson Drag Chutes was founded.

The first person to inquire about and use his parachute was "Big Daddy" Don Garlits. He evolved his business into a number of other safety items, such as gloves, helmets, restraints, and shoes. Simpson designed NASA's first umbilical cords, where he met Pete Conrad. Conrad introduced Simpson to DuPont product Nomex in 1967. Simpson used the product to create the first fire suit to be used in racing. He took the suit to the 1967 Indianapolis 500 where it was worn by 30 of 33 drivers. Simpson had developed over 200 racing safety products, including three generations of fire suits. Simpson demonstrated the suit's effectiveness in 1987, when he was set on fire while wearing a suit. To this day, drivers in the NHRA refer to their fire suits as the "Simpson Suit," primarily due to the fact that Simpson Performance Products is synonymous with the fire suit, and also, even to this day, the Simpson name still appears on several of the fire suits, including those worn by the NHRA's Safety Safari crews.

Usage

Simpson Performance Products racing safety products have been used in many motorsport disciplines, including IndyCars, NASCAR, and National Hot Rod Association. All International Race of Champions (IROC) cars were fitted with Simpson belts and window nets until the sanctioning body closed. Until 2006, Simpson Performance Products was the only company to supply all of the safety items used in NASCAR racing. NASCAR officials continue to trust Simpson products today. The modern Simpson Performance Products has grown to include a comprehensive line of racing safety products and manufactures some of their products in Texas, North Carolina, and California, while other products are manufactured overseas. Simpson has 5 locations which include Indiana, North Carolina, Texas, and California. The company was founded in 1959 by Bill Simpson. Simpson safety gear is sold all over the world.
A line of Simpson helmets, nicknamed the "Star Wars" helmet has been in production since 1979. The original model was named the RX-1 (RXM-1 for motorcycle use), then renamed the Model 30 shortly thereafter. The basic design was revised with fewer air slots and renamed the "Bandit." A number of different Bandit versions have followed. The similarly designed "Diamondback" is notably worn by The Stig from the BBC TV Top Gear series.

The current Bandit helmet lineup from Simpson includes a Carbon Fiber Bandit, introduced in 2012. The X-Bandit Pro is a full carbon Super Helmet, Snell 2010, and FIA 8860 approved. Simpson’s U.S. manufacturing facility is located New Braunfels, Texas.
The similarly designed "Diamondback" is notably worn by The Stig from the BBC TV Top Gear series.

Simpson today

Simpson Performance Products is headquartered in New Braunfels, Texas. Much of the company's harness systems, HANS head restraints, flagship parachutes are manufactured and tested at the site. Simpson firesuits and crew uniforms are manufactured outside of Los Angeles, CA in their 52,000 sq. foot facility. Simpson also has a factory in Pedrengo (Italy) where helmets are manufactured. Simpson also employs the largest customer service and sales team, based in Mooresville, North Carolina.

Simpson milestones
2016
- May, Simpson forms Motorcycle Safety Unit to meet demand for Simpson Motorcycle Helmets.

2015
- December, Simpson acquires Stilo S.r.l., a leading manufacturer and designer of premier racing helmets and helmet communications for Global motorsports
- February, Simpson Granted a U.S. Patent for multi-tether system for head restraint devices

2013
- October, Simpson Acquires the Rights for Shock Doctor Eject Emergency Helmet Removal System

2012
- January, Simpson Hybrid Head & Neck Restraints Receives FIA Approval
- January, Simpson Announces Simpson, Europe and Ramps Up Presence in the European Market for Motorsports Safety
- January, Simpson Names Jan Phersson as Manager of Simpson Europe
- January, Simpson X-Bandit Pro Helmet Receives FIA Approval and the Distinction of Being the First U.S.-Manufacturerd FIA 8860 Approved “Super Helmet”
- September, Simpson acquires HANS Performance Products

2011
- September, NASCAR Approves the Simpson Hybrid Pro Head & Neck Restraint for Use in NASCAR Competition

2010
- January, Simpson Is Selected As Safety Equipment Supplier to John Force Racing
- January, Simpson Sign With Molucule Labs™, a Premier Line of Performance Fabric Care Products, As The Exclusive Worldwide Supplier
- January, Simpson Partners With John Force Racing in a Multi-Year Safety Initiative
- January, Simpson Enters a Contingency Program with the International Hot Rod Association (IHRA) for the 2010 Racing Season -April, Simpson Sponsors the Richard Petty Driver Search
- September, Simpson Introduces the Vixen line of Racing Suits Designed Exclusively for the Female Physique
- December, Simpson Acquires Safety Solutions, Manufacturer of Head & Neck Restraints

2009
- Simpson Signs On As Contingency Sponsor with the American Drag Racing League (ADRL) 2010 Racing Season

2008
- Simpson introduces re-designed multi-functional e-commerce website, www.teamsimpson.com.
- Simpson introduces Devil Ray super-light Carbon Fiber Helmet.
- Simpson Introduces Mercury Drag Helmet.
- Simpson Introduces Diamond S-Lite Nomex Drag Suit with 15% lighter weight.
- Simpson introduces line of multi-functional off-road seats with easy harness removal system.
- Simpson partners with Racing Electronics to offer communication-equipped factory-installed helmets.
- Simpson partners with SCCA for Member Benefits Program.
- Simpson re-signs 3-year contingency program with NASCAR through 2011.
- Simpson re-signs contingency program with NHRA.

2007
- Simpson introduces the StingRay helmet.
- Simpson introduces 7 point belts for Top Fuel and Funny Car racing.
- Enters into agreement with RH2 to sell Simpson product trackside at IHRA events.
- Simpson enters Sand Off road market with patented D3 Restraint.

2006
- Simpson introduces Raider Helmet.
- Simpson consolidates all California manufacturing into new Harbor City facility.
- Simpson sells 1,000th full size collectible helmet.
- Simpson introduces Talladega Crew Shirt.

2005
- Simpson introduces Diamondback Helmet.

2004
- Simpson introduces Valor Helmet with V-Aero Technology.
- Simpson offers CarbonX option on Firesuits.

2002
- Platinum Series Belts introduced.

2000
- Simpson Child Car Safety Seat introduced.

1999
- Generation 11 Driving Suits introduced. Helmet breaks three-pound barrier. Nomex K introduced in Simpson drag suits.

1997
- Simpson opens 80,000 sq. ft. manufacturing facility in New Braunfels, Texas. Simpson World opens in Indianapolis, Indiana.

1995
- Suit and Restraint Factory nearly doubled in capacity.

1994
- Simpson Race Products named Car Craft Manufacturer of the Year.
- Opens Simpson World Racing Store and Museum in Mooresville, North Carolina.

1993
- Simpson Race Products opens 10,000 sq. ft. factory for shoe production in Speedway, Indiana.

1991
- Simpson Race Products named Car Craft Manufacturer of the Year.

1979
- RX-1 Helmet introduced – 23 of 33 qualifiers at the Indy 500 wear this helmet.

1968
- Simpson products are being sold worldwide. Company moves to larger facility in Torrance, California.

1967
- Heat Shield Firesuit introduced – driver has more protection and comfort.

1965
- Pre-Air Breather Hood introduced – protects drivers from fire and noxious fumes emitted by nitro-burning engine.

1964
- Simpson Firesuit introduced – major advance in safety history.

1959
- Simpson introduces the first drag racing parachute.

References

External links
 

Automotive motorsports and performance companies
Helmet manufacturers
Companies based in New Braunfels, Texas
New Braunfels, Texas